A legislative building is a building in which a legislature sits and makes laws for its respective political entity. The term used for the building varies between the political entities, such as "building", "capitol", "hall", "house", or "palace".

National

Africa

Americas

Asia

Europe

Dependencies

Oceania

Supranational

Europe

Sub-national

Australia

Canada

New Zealand

Portugal

United Kingdom

United States

References

Lists of government buildings
Buildings